Azafran may refer to:

 The Spanish name for Saffron
 Corrales azafran, also known as Safflower, a substitute spice for Saffron